Phungzathang Tonsing was an Indian politician and member of the National People's Party. Tonsing was a member of the Manipur Legislative Assembly from the Churachandpur constituency on the Indian National Congress ticket in Churachandpur district. He was a part of the Paite people. Political Positions held:

~ 1972 - Elected Member of District Council (MDC) from Ngazam Constituency (unopposed) from Congress (I) ticket. Became Chairman, Autonomous District Council,
Churachandpur.

~ 1980 - Elected Member of Legislative Assembly (MLA) from Thanlon Assembly
Constituency from Congress (I) ticket. Became Minister of State (MoS) for Medical/Sports/Publicity & Tourism.

~ 1984 - Elected Member of Legislative Assembly (MLA) from Thanlon Assembly
Constituency from Congress (I) ticket for the second term. Became Minister of Health & Family Welfare

Established ANM/FHW Training School nearby District Hospital Campus, Churachandpur
in 1985.

~ 1990 - Elected Member of Legislative Assembly (MLA) from Thanlon Assembly
Constituency from Congress (I) ticket for the third term. Became Minister of Public 
Health Engineering Department & Tourism.

~ 1995 - Appointed President of Manipur Pradesh Congress Committee (MPCC) during the regime of Shri Narashimha Rao, Hon’ble Prime Minister of India till 1998.

~ 2002 - Elected Member of Legislative Assembly (MLA) from Churachandpur Assembly Constituency from Indian National Congress [INC] ticket. Became Minister of Irrigation & Flood Control Department/Tribal Development & Transport.

~ 2007 - Elected Member of Legislative Assembly (MLA) from Churachandpur Assembly Constituency from Indian National Congress [INC] ticket for the second term in Churachandpur Assembly Constituency. Became Minister of Power/Horticulture & Soil Conservation/Tribal Development & Hills.

~ 2012 - Elected Member of Legislative Assembly (MLA) from Churachandpur Assembly Constituency from Indian National Congress [INC] ticket for the third term in Churachandpur Assembly Constituency. Became Minister of Health & Family Welfare/General Administrative Department/Command Area Development Agency till 2015.

~ He was a Member of All India Congress Committee (AICC) till 2016. He died on 19 December 2018 at Apollo Hospital, New Delhi.

References 

People from Churachandpur district
Indian National Congress politicians
National People's Party (India) politicians
2018 deaths
Manipur politicians
21st-century Indian politicians
1939 births
Manipur MLAs 2002–2007
Manipur MLAs 2007–2012
Manipur MLAs 2012–2017
Manipur MLAs 1990–1995
Manipur MLAs 1980–1984
Manipur MLAs 1985–1990